Sairadelphys is an extinct genus of didelphine opossums from the Pleistocene of South America.

Taxonomy 
Sairadelphys is a didelphine opossum, described as a sister taxon to Hyladelphys. Sairadelphys tocantinensis is the only recognized species, and it is known from deposits in the Gruta dos Mouras cave, Tocantins, Brazil.

Biology 
The more flattened molars of Sairadelphys indicate of diet of both fruit and insects. It had an estimated mass of less than 40 g.

References 

†Sairadelphys
Fauna of South America
Marsupials of South America
Prehistoric marsupial genera